Saint John the Baptist Church, commonly known as Kanach Zham is an Armenian Apostolic church in Shusha (known to Armenians as Shushi) in Azerbaijan, in the disputed region of Nagorno-Karabakh, located just uphill from the Ghazanchetsots Cathedral. Kanach Zham means "Green Chapel" in Armenian, which refers to the previously green domes of the church. The church is sometimes also called Gharabakhtsots, the name of the old wooden church that was previously located in the same place as Kanach Zham, and which was named as such in honor of the farmers of Nagorno-Karabakh who built it.

There have been reports of its destruction or demolition after the 2020 Nagorno-Karabakh war, based on satellite images, though the Azerbaijani government and the Baku Eparchy of the Russian Orthodox Church maintain that the church, which suffered damage during the war, is still standing and undergoing "renovation".

History 
The church was built in 1818 in the same place as the former Gharabakhtsots wooden church. The church is built according to a unique cruciform scheme, with the eastern facade of the church being adjacent to the western part of the chapel, and the tall dome of the church and its chapel can both be seen clearly from a distance across the town. The interior of the church also has some unique architectural features. Above the entrance to the church, is an inscription from 1847 that says "Babayan Stepanos Hovhannes. In the memory of his deceased brother Mkrtych."

Damage 
Around November 2020, both Armenian and foreign sources stated that the towers of the church had been destroyed by Azerbaijan after the capture of the town in the 2020 Nagorno-Karabakh war, referring to pictures and a video circulating online of the partially destroyed church. The Mother See of Holy Etchmiadzin of the Armenian Apostolic Church condemned the damage in a statement in November.

Satellite images taken on February 15, 2021 showed the church had suffered significant damage in the time since it had come under Azerbaijani rule. This received coverage in Armenian and international press outlets, including in Le Monde. The destruction of the church can be seen on Google Maps in April 2021. An Azerbaijani news agency denied Kanach Zham's destruction, while also denying the church's Armenian heritage (Azerbaijani sources ascribe a Russian provenance to the church, claiming that it was modified according to an "Armenianized" style in the 1840s.). It stated that the church, which had been severely damaged during the war, was undergoing renovation and its dome was being rebuilt. The Russian Orthodox Church Eparchy of Baku also claims that the church is to be renovated. Video footage from a BBC Russian reporter who visited Shusha in September 2021 showed that the church was undergoing ostensible renovation.

Caucasus Heritage Watch, a watchdog group made up of researchers from Purdue and Cornell, currently lists Kanach Zham's status as "damaged" on its website documenting the fate of architectural monuments in the region.

Gallery

References 

Armenian culture
Armenian buildings in Azerbaijan
Armenian Apostolic Church
Armenian Apostolic churches
Armenian Apostolic monasteries
Armenian Apostolic monasteries in Azerbaijan
Churches completed in 1818
Buildings and structures demolished in 2020
Destroyed churches
Churches in Shusha
Diocese of Artsakh